The 1990 Georgia gubernatorial election was held on November 6, 1990.  Lieutenant Governor Zell Miller ran for governor after incumbent Joe Frank Harris was term-limited, defeating Andrew Young, Roy Barnes, and Lester Maddox for the Democratic nomination, and defeated Johnny Isakson, a member of the Georgia House of Representatives.

Isakson would later succeed Miller in the United States Senate following his victory in 2004.

Democratic primary

Candidates

Advanced to runoff
 Zell Miller, Lieutenant Governor since 1975
 Andrew Young, Mayor of Atlanta

Defeated in primary
 Roy Barnes, State Senator from Marietta
 Lauren 'Bubba' McDonald, Jr., State Representative from Turnerville
 Lester Maddox, former Governor of Georgia and Lieutenant Governor of Georgia

Results

Runoff Results

Republican primary

Candidates
 Johnny Isakson, State Representative from Marietta
 Bobby Wood, former chairman of Gwinnett County Board of Education
 Greeley Ellis
 Eli 'Link' Veazey

Results

Election results

See also
1990 United States gubernatorial elections
State of Georgia
Governors of Georgia
Senators from Georgia

References

Gubernatorial
1990
1990 United States gubernatorial elections